This is a list of mayors of the city of Biel/Bienne, Switzerland.

Biel Bienne
Mayors of Biel Bienne, list
 
Biel/Bienne
Lists of mayors (complete 1900-2013)